The canton of Cusset is an administrative division of the Allier department, in central France. It was created at the French canton reorganisation which came into effect in March 2015. Its seat is in Cusset.

It consists of the following communes: 
Bost 
Creuzier-le-Neuf
Creuzier-le-Vieux
Cusset

References

Cantons of Allier